Hubbardia is a genus of hubbardiid short-tailed whipscorpions, first described by Orator Cook in 1899.

Species 
, the World Schizomida Catalog accepts the following nine species:

 Hubbardia belkini (McDonald & Hogue, 1957) – US (California)
 Hubbardia borregoensis (Briggs & Hom, 1966) – US (California)
 Hubbardia briggsi (Rowland, 1972) – US (California)
 Hubbardia idria Reddell & Cokendolpher, 1991 – US (California)
 Hubbardia joshuensis (Rowland, 1971) – US (California)
 Hubbardia pentapeltis Cook, 1899 – US (California)
 Hubbardia secoensis (Briggs & Hom, 1988) – US (California)
 Hubbardia shoshonensis (Briggs & Hom, 1972) – US (California)
 Hubbardia wessoni (Chamberlin, 1939) – US (Arizona)

References

Schizomida